The 2022 Qwick Wick 250  was a NASCAR Pinty's Series race that was held on June 11, 2022. It was contested over 250 laps on the  oval. It was the 3rd race of the 2022 NASCAR Pinty's Series season. Andrew Ranger collected his first victory of the season, and the 31st of his career.

Report

Entry list 

 (R) denotes rookie driver.
 (i) denotes driver who is ineligible for series driver points.

Practice

Qualifying

Qualifying results

Race 

Laps: 250

Race statistics 

 Lead changes:  4
 Cautions/Laps: 11 for 73 laps
 Time of race: 1:26:23
 Average speed: 43.11 mph

References 

2022 NASCAR Pinty's Series
Qwick Wick 250